(Glory to God in the Highest), 191, is a church cantata written by the German Baroque composer Johann Sebastian Bach, and the only one of his church cantatas set to a Latin text. He composed the Christmas cantata in Leipzig probably in 1742, for a celebration by the university of Leipzig. The composition's three movements all derive from the Gloria of Bach's 1733 Kyrie–Gloria Mass, which the composer would later use as the Gloria of his Mass in B minor.

History 
 was written in Leipzig for Christmas Day, as indicated by the heading on the manuscript in Bach's own handwriting, " – Celebration for the birth of Christ), to be sung around the sermon. Recent archival and manuscript evidence suggest the cantata was first performed, not in 1743, nor in 1745 at a special Christmas Day service to celebrate the Peace of Dresden, which brought to an end the hardships imposed on the region by the Second Silesian War, but likely in 1742, for a regular Christmas celebration by the university of Leipzig at the Paulinerkirche.

Unlike Bach's other church cantatas, the words are not in German, taken from the Bible, a chorale or contemporary poetry, but in Latin, taken from the Gloria and the Doxology. This late work is the only Latin cantata among around 200 surviving sacred cantatas in German. It is based on an earlier composition, Bach's 1733 Mass for the Dresden court, which would, in 1748, become the first part of his monumental Mass in B minor. The first movement (Gloria) is an almost identical copy of the first two movements of the Gloria of the earlier work, while the second and third movements are close parodies of the earlier Gloria's fifth and ninth movements. The modifications Bach made to the last two movements of BWV 191, however, were not carried over into the final manuscript compilation of the Mass in B minor, leaving it a matter of speculation whether or not these constitute "improvements" to Bach's original score.

Scoring, words and structure 
The cantata bears the heading :: in Bach's own handwriting. The cantata is festively scored for soprano and tenor soloists and an unusual five-part choir (with a dual soprano part), three trumpets, timpani, two flauto traverso, two oboes, two violins, viola, and basso continuo. Its only link to Christmas is the opening chorus on Luke, to be performed before the sermon.

 Coro: 
 Duetto (soprano/tenor): 
 Coro:

Recordings 
 Die Bach Kantate Vol. 16, Helmuth Rilling, Gächinger Kantorei, Bach-Collegium Stuttgart, Nobuko Gamo-Yamamoto, Adalbert Kraus, Hänssler 1971
 J. S. Bach: Weihnachtsoratorium, Ludwig Güttler, Concentus Vocalis Wien, Virtuosi Saxoniae, Christiane Oelze, Hans Peter Blochwitz, Dresden Classics 1995
 J. S. Bach: Complete Cantatas Vol. 21, Ton Koopman, Amsterdam Baroque Orchestra & Choir, Caroline Stam, Paul Agnew, Antoine Marchand 1999
 Bach Cantatas Vol. 18: Weimar/Leipzig/Hamburg / For Christmas Day & for Epiphany / For the 1st Sunday after Epiphany, John Eliot Gardiner, Monteverdi Choir, English Baroque Soloists, Claron McFadden, Christoph Genz, Soli Deo Gloria 1999
 J. S. Bach: Kantate BWV 191 «Gloria in Excelsis Deo», Rudolf Lutz, Vokalensemble der Schola Seconda Pratica, Schola Seconda Pratica, Gerlinde Sämann, Johannes Kaleschke, Gallus Media 2009
 Bach Cantatas Vol. 55, Masaaki Suzuki, Bach Collegium Japan, Hana Blažíková, Gerd Türk, BIS Records 2013

References

Further reading

External links 
 Gloria in excelsis Deo, BWV 191: performance by the Netherlands Bach Society (video and background information)
 
 [www.emmanuelmusic.org/bach-notes/bwv-191 BWV 191 – "Gloria in excelsis Deo"] Cantata notes, Emmanuel Music
 BWV 191 Gloria in excelsis Deo English translation, University of Vermont
 
 Chapter 54 BWV 191 Gloria in excelsis Deo / Glory to God in the highest. Julian Mincham, 2010

Church cantatas by Johann Sebastian Bach
1745 compositions
Christmas cantatas